Aloe bruynsii is a species of flowering plant in the family Asphodelaceae. It is endemic to Madagascar.

References

bruynsii
Endemic flora of Madagascar
Taxa named by Paul Irwin Forster